This is a list of members of the Tasmanian House of Assembly between the 1897 election and the 1900 election.

Party affiliations were relatively loose during the period, although a Liberal grouping had formed over the 1890s around Sir Edward Braddon, the Premier of Tasmania until 12 October 1899, and Andrew Inglis Clark. A separate grouping, generally described as Ministerial, supported Elliott Lewis, who was Premier for the final five months of the parliamentary term. As was common at such changes in Tasmanian politics, several Liberal MHAs affiliated with the new government by the time of the 1900 election.

The 1897 election was the first to use a limited version of the Hare-Clark system within Hobart and Launceston, which were given 6 and 4 seats respectively, while still using first past the post single-member constituencies elsewhere in the state. It was renewed and adjusted periodically until the 1909 election, when the entire State was redivided into five electorates using the Hare-Clark system.

Notes
 On 17 June 1898, Liberal member Andrew Inglis Clark, one of the six members representing Hobart, resigned. Liberal candidate Charles Hoggins won the resulting by-election on 17 June 1898 against two former members, George Hiddlestone and Windle St Hill.
 In June 1898, the Ministerial member for Devonport, John Henry, resigned. Ministerial candidate William Aikenhead won the resulting by-election on 21 June 1898; however, the election was declared void. In October 1898, the Ministerial member for the neighbouring seat of Latrobe, Henry Murray, resigned to contest the resulting by-election (held on 25 October 1898), whilst Aikenhead contested the now-vacant seat of Latrobe at a by-election on 15 October 1898. Both were successful.
 On 30 December 1898, Liberal member Sir Philip Fysh, one of the six members representing Hobart, resigned. Liberal candidate William Propsting won the resulting by-election on 16 February 1899.
 In 1899, a new electoral district, Lyell, was created in western Tasmania. Liberal candidate James Gaffney won the resulting by-election on 10 April 1899. The by-election was notable for being the first to be contested by the Labor Party in Tasmania—its candidate, R. Matthews, gained 40% of the votes.
 On 6 May 1899, the Liberal member for Oatlands and the Minister for Lands and Works, Alfred Pillinger, died. Ministerial candidate William Burbury was elected unopposed on 19 May 1899, endangering the chances of the Liberal government's chances of surviving a motion of no confidence. 
 On 2 October 1899, Edward Miles, the Liberal member for Glamorgan and Minister for Lands and Works, was forced to resign from the Ministry and from Parliament following allegations of corruption and mismanagement in his portfolio by a Select Committee. His resignation triggered the fall of the government four days later in a motion of no confidence. Ministerial candidate Frederick Shaw won the resulting by-election on 25 October 1899.
 On 21 October 1899, Norman Cameron, the Ministerial member for Deloraine, resigned. Ministerial candidate Jonathan Best won the resulting by-election on 10 November 1899.

 Ministerial by-elections

 On 23 October 1897, Don Urquhart, the member for Montagu, was appointed Attorney-General in the Braddon Ministry. He was returned unopposed at the resulting ministerial by-election on 19 November 1897.
 On 1 January 1899, Premier Sir Edward Braddon replaced the outgoing minister Sir Philip Fysh as Colonial Treasurer and Postmaster-General. He was returned unopposed at the resulting ministerial by-election on 11 February 1899.
 On 10 May 1899, Edward Miles was appointed to fill the vacancy in the Ministry caused by Pillinger's death, and was returned unopposed at the resulting ministerial by-election on 19 May 1899.
 On 12 October 1899, following the fall of the Braddon government, Elliott Lewis was invited to form a government. At the resulting ministerial by-elections, two were returned unopposed on 20 October 1899, while the remaining member, Edward Mulcahy, won his seat against two opponents on 25 October 1899.

Sources
 
 
 Parliament of Tasmania (2006). The Parliament of Tasmania from 1856

Members of Tasmanian parliaments by term
19th-century Australian politicians